Derby Dining Center, named after reference librarian Grace Derby, is the largest dining facility at Kansas State University's campus and serves approximately 2,000 students living in Ford, Haymaker, Moore and West Residence Halls. Home to the Wildcat Training Table, The Derb’ (Derby) is on the East side of campus. T•H•E Bakery, a retail bakery, is located on the ground floor of Derby Dining.

Architecture
This building consists of two floors.  The bottom floor houses many of the noteworthy resources available for students.  The upper floor functions as the main dining location with various food lines as well as seating for students, staff, and guests. 

The outside of the building is stylized with the same historic looking limestone fascia that is predominant of many buildings throughout campus.   

Further notable elements of this building include the tunnels that connect each of the four residence halls (Ford, Haymaker, Moore and West) within the Derby complex to the dining center.

Noteworthy Resources
There are a number of additional resources that can be found within Derby.

ResNet Help Desk
The ResNet Help Desk - Provides technical support for students living in the residence halls and Jardine Apartments at K-State. They assist with network registration, connection issues, and general technical support for computers, mobile devices, printers, or gaming devices.

ARH/NRHH
The primary office location for the NRHH is housed within the basement floor of Derby.

References

Residence halls at Kansas State University
Kansas State University academic buildings